The Villa Schmitz is a historic mansion in Nice, Alpes-Maritimes, France. It was built from 1884 to 1887 for Victoire Schmitz. It was designed by architect Vincent Levrot. It has been listed as an official national monument since October 1, 2010.

References

Houses completed in 1887
Monuments historiques of Nice